Gerald Stanley Wilson (September 4, 1918 – September 8, 2014) was an American jazz trumpeter, big band bandleader, composer, arranger, and educator. Born in Mississippi, he was based in Los Angeles from the early 1940s. In addition to being a band leader, Wilson wrote arrangements for Duke Ellington, Sarah Vaughan, Ray Charles, Julie London, Dizzy Gillespie, Ella Fitzgerald, Benny Carter, Lionel Hampton, Billie Holiday, Dinah Washington, and Nancy Wilson.

Early life
Wilson was born in Shelby, Mississippi, and at the age of 16 moved to Detroit, Michigan, where he graduated from Cass Technical High School (one of his classmates was saxophonist Wardell Gray). He joined the Jimmie Lunceford orchestra in 1939, replacing its trumpeter and arranger, Sy Oliver. While with Lunceford, Wilson contributed songs to the band, including "Hi Spook" and "Yard-dog Mazurka", the first influenced by Ellington's recording of "Caravan" and the latter an influence on Stan Kenton's "Intermission Riff".

During World War II, Wilson also performed for a brief time with the U.S. Navy, with  Clark Terry, Willie Smith and Jimmy Nottingham. Around 2005, many of the members of the band reunited as The Great Lakes Experience Big Band" with Wilson conducting and Ernie Andrews making a guest appearance at the invitation of Clark Terry. Wilson also played and arranged for the bands of Benny Carter, Duke Ellington, Count Basie and Dizzy Gillespie.

Career

Wilson formed his own band, with some success in the mid-1940s. Wilson and His 20-Pc. Recording Orchestra  performed at the famed twelfth Cavalcade of Jazz held at Wrigley Field in Los Angeles which was produced by Leon Hefflin, Sr. on September 2, 1956. Also performing that day were Dinah Washington, The Mel Williams Dots, Julie Stevens, Little Richard, Chuck Higgin's Orchestra, Willie Hayden & Five Black Birds, The Premiers, Bo Rhambo, and Jerry Gray and his Orchestra.

In 1960, he formed a Los Angeles-based band that began a series of critically acclaimed recordings for the Pacific Jazz label. His 1968 album California Soul featured a title track written by Ashford & Simpson, as well as a version of The Doors' hit "Light My Fire". Musicians in the band at various times included lead trumpeter Snooky Young, trumpet soloist Carmell Jones and saxophonists Bud Shank, Joe Maini, Harold Land, Teddy Edwards, and Don Raffell. The rhythm section included guitarist Joe Pass, Richard Holmes (organist), vibists Roy Ayers and Bobby Hutcherson, and drummers Mel Lewis and Mel Lee.

Wilson's wife of more than 50 years, Josefina Villasenor Wilson, is Mexican-American, and a number of his compositions showed his love of Spanish/Mexican themes, especially "Viva Tirado", which later became a hit for the rock band El Chicano. With his wife, Wilson had three daughters (Jeri, Lillian (Teri) and Nancy Jo), his son Anthony (who is guitarist for Diana Krall), and a number of grandchildren, all of whom have songs composed for them—his compositions were often inspired by his family members.

Wilson continued leading bands and recording in later decades for the Discovery and MAMA labels. Recent musicians included Luis Bonilla, Rick Baptist, Randall Willis, Wilson's son-in-law Shuggie Otis and son Anthony Wilson (both guitarists); his grandson Eric Otis also played on such recordings. Wilson continued to record Spanish-flavored compositions, notably the bravura trumpet solos "Carlos" (named for Mexican matador Carlos Arruza, and recorded three times over the years, featuring trumpeters Jimmy Owens, Oscar Brashear, and Ron Barrows) and "Lomelin" (also named for a matador—Antonio Lomelin—and recorded twice, with solos by Oscar Brashear and Jon Faddis).

The National Endowment for the Arts named Wilson an NEA Jazz Master in 1990. In 1998 Wilson received a commission from the Monterey Jazz Festival for an original composition, resulting in "Theme for Monterey", which was performed at that year's festival. In later years, he formed orchestras on the West and East coasts, each with local outstanding musicians. He also made special appearances as guest conductor, including with the Carnegie Hall Jazz Band (now the Jon Faddis Jazz Orchestra of New York), the Lincoln Center Jazz Orchestra, the Chicago Jazz Ensemble and European radio jazz orchestras, conducting the BBC Big Band in 2005. He hosted an innovative show, in the 1970s, on KBCA in Los Angeles, which was co-hosted by Dennis Smith, where he played "...music of the past, the present, and the future."

Wilson was a member of the faculty at California State University, Los Angeles and the University of California, Los Angeles, for many years recently winning a "teacher of the year" award. In the 1970s he also served on the faculty at California State University, Northridge, where he taught Jazz History to wide acclaim among the student body, and has also taught at Cal Arts in Los Angeles.

In February 2006, Wynton Marsalis and the Lincoln Center Jazz Orchestra performed his music with Gerald Wilson conducting. He had a unique style of conducting: "Garbed in well tailored suits, his long white hair flowing, Wilson shaped the music with dynamic movements and the elegant grace of a modern dancer." Asked about his style of conducting by Terry Gross on the NPR show Fresh Air in 2006, he replied, "It's different from any style you've ever seen before. I move. I choreograph the music as I conduct. You see, I point it out, everything you're to listen to."

In June 2007, Wilson returned to the studio with producer Al Pryor and an all-star big band to record a special album of compositions commissioned and premiered at the Monterey Jazz Festival for the festival's 50th anniversary. Wilson had helped lead celebrations of the festival's 20th and 40th anniversary with his specially commissioned works (1998's Grammy-nominated album Theme for Monterey). The album Monterey Moods was released on Mack Avenue Records in September 2007. In September 2009, Wilson conducted his eight-movement suite "Detroit", commissioned by the Detroit Jazz Festival to mark its 30th anniversary. The work includes a movement entitled "Cass Tech" in honor of his high school alma mater. In 2011, his last recording was the Grammy-nominated Legacy.

Death
Wilson died at his home in Los Angeles, California, on September 8, 2014, four days after his 96th birthday, after a brief illness that followed a bout of pneumonia, which had hospitalized him.

Awards and honors
1990 NEA Jazz Masters Award
1996 Library of Congress Gerald Wilson archive of his life's work
1997 American Jazz Award: Best Arranger and Best Big Band
2008 Monterey Jazz Festival Jazz Legends Award
2012 Los Angeles County Museum of Art/Los Angeles Jazz Society L.A. Jazz Treasure Award

Grammy nominations

|-
|style="text-align:center;"|
|"Tell Me the Truth" (track for Nancy Wilson)
|Best Background arrangement (behind vocalists or instrumentalist)
|
|-
|style="text-align:center;"|
|"Paco" (track)
|Best Original Jazz Composition
|
|-
|style="text-align:center;"|
|State Street Sweet (album)
|Best Large Ensemble Jazz Performance
|
|-
|style="text-align:center;"|
|Theme For Monterey (album)
|Best Large Ensemble Jazz Performance
|
|-
|style="text-align:center;"|
|"Romance" (track)
|Best Instrumental Composition
|
|-
|style="text-align:center;"|
|New York, New Sound (album)
|Best Large Ensemble Jazz Album
|
|-
|style="text-align:center;"|
|Legacy (album)
|Best Large Ensemble Jazz Album
|
|-

Grammy Award–nominated and -winning singles or albums contributed to
{| class="wikitable"
|-
! Year
! Grammy category
! Album or Single
! Primary artist
! Label
! Role/Content composed or arranged
! Honor
|-
|rowspan="3"|1959
|align="center"|Best Musical Composition First Recorded and Released in 1959 (more than 5 minutes duration)
|rowspan="3"|Anatomy of a Murder (Soundtrack album)
|rowspan="3"|Duke Ellington
|rowspan="3"|Columbia
|rowspan="3"|trumpet/instrumentalist on all tracks
|
|-
|align="center"|Best Sound Track Album
|
|-
|align="center"|Best Performance by a Dance Band
|
|-
|1963
|align="center"|Album of the Year
|rowspan="2"|Modern Sounds in Country and Western Music (album)
|rowspan="2"|Ray Charles
|rowspan="2"|ABC-Paramount
|rowspan="2"|arranger - Bye Bye Love/Just A Little Lovin'/Careless Love/Hey, Good Lookin'
|
|-
|1999
|align="center"|Grammy Hall of Fame
|
|-

Discography

As leader
 You Better Believe It! (Pacific Jazz, 1961)
 Moment of Truth (Pacific Jazz, 1962)
 Portraits (Pacific Jazz, 1964)
 On Stage (Pacific Jazz, 1965)
 McCann/Wilson with Les McCann  (Pacific Jazz, 1965)
 Feelin' Kinda Blues (Pacific Jazz, 1966)
 The Golden Sword (Pacific Jazz, 1966)
 Live and Swinging (Pacific Jazz, 1967)
 Everywhere (Pacific Jazz, 1968)
 California Soul (Pacific Jazz, 1968)
 Eternal Equinox (Pacific Jazz, 1969)
 Groovin' High In L.A. 1946 (Hep, 1977)
 Lomelin (Discovery, 1981)
 Jessica (Trend, 1982)
 Calafia (Trend, 1984)
 Jenna (Discovery, 1989)
 State Street Sweet (MAMA Foundation/Summit, 1994)
 Suite Memories (MAMA Foundation, 1996)
 Theme for Monterey (MAMA Foundation/Summit, 1997)
 New York, New Sound (Mack Avenue, 2003)
 In My Time (Mack Avenue, 2005)
 Monterey Moods (Mack Avenue, 2007)
 Detroit (Mack Avenue, 2009)
 Legacy (Mack Avenue, 2011)

As sideman
With Buddy Collette
 Man of Many Parts (Contemporary, 1956)
 Buddy's Best (Dooto, 1958)
 Polynesia (Music & Sound, 1959)

With Duke Ellington
 Dance to the Duke! (Capitol, 1954) 
 Anatomy of a Murder (Columbia, 1959)
 Swinging Suites by Edward E. and Edward G. (Columbia, 1960)
 Piano in the Background (Columbia, 1962)

With Jimmy Witherspoon
 Singin' the Blues (World Pacific, 1959)
  'Spoon (Reprise, 1961)
 Roots (Reprise, 1962)

With others
 Count Basie, The Count (RCA Camden, 1958)
 Count Basie, Shoutin' Blues 1949 (Bluebird, 1993)
 Kenny Burrell, 75th Birthday Bash Live! (Blue Note/EMI, 2006) 
 Red Callender, The Lowest (MetroJazz, 1958)
 Curtis Counce, Carl's Blues (Contemporary, 1960)
 Curtis Counce, Sonority (Contemporary, 1989)
 Neal Hefti, Jazz Pops (Reprise, 1962)
 Carmell Jones, Business Meetin'  (Pacific Jazz, 1962)
 Tricky Lofton & Carmell Jones, Brass Bag (Pacific Jazz, 1962)
 Jimmie Lunceford, Lunceford Special (Columbia, 1956; reissue: 1967)
 Jimmie Lunceford, The Chronological Jimmie Lunceford & His Orchestra 1939-1940 (Classics, 1991)
 Les McCann, Les McCann Sings (Pacific Jazz, 1961)
 Little Esther, Better Beware (Charly, 1990)
 Googie Rene, Romesville! (Class, 1959)
 Leroy Vinnegar, Leroy Walks! (Contemporary, 1958)

References

 Jürgen Wölfer, Gerald Wilson Discography, Almere (NL) 2012

External links

 
 Interview with Gerald Wilson NAMM Oral History Library (2004)
 Interview of Gerald S. Wilson, Center for Oral History Research, UCLA
 The Legacy of Gerald Wilson - Panel Discussion on Detroit JazzStage - Jazz Extras
 Interview by Jason Crane (Part 1) from The Jazz Session Podcast Series
 Artist page at jazzprofiles blogspot

American jazz bandleaders
American jazz composers
American male jazz composers
American jazz trumpeters
American male trumpeters
American music arrangers
American jazz educators
Big band bandleaders
Cass Technical High School alumni
People from Shelby, Mississippi
Duke Ellington Orchestra members
African-American jazz musicians
1918 births
2014 deaths
Deaths from pneumonia in California
Jazz musicians from Mississippi
Mack Avenue Records artists
Discovery Records artists
Summit Records artists